Ruben Gonzales and Darren Walsh are the defending champions, but Gonzales has decided not to participate while Walsh is partnering with Jason Jung . But Walsh and Jung Lost To Marcelo Arevalo and Sergio Galdos in the quarterfinals . 

Philip Bester and Peter Polansky won the title, defeating Arevalo and Galdos in the final 6–4, 3–6, [10–6] .

Seeds

Draw

References
Main Draw

2016 ATP Challenger Tour